Ruini is a surname. Notable people with the surname include:

 Camillo Ruini (born 1931), Italian prelate of the Catholic Church
 Carlo Ruini (1530–1598), Italian anatomist
 Meuccio Ruini (1877–1970), Italian politician

See also
 Ruini Firenze, sports club

Italian-language surnames